Chuck Gatschenberger (born February 28, 1956) is a Republican politician. He was a member of the Missouri House of Representatives, representing the 13th District which encompasses portions of Warren and St. Charles counties. He was first elected to the Missouri House in November, 2008. In 2014, Gatschenberger ran for the Missouri Senate and lost to Dr. Bob Onder in the Republican primary.

Personal life
Chuck Gatschenberger was born and raised in Springfield, Illinois. After attending Southeast High School and St. James High School he earned a bachelor's degree from the University of Missouri-St. Louis. He is divorced from his wife Donnette and they have three children. When not occupied with his legislative duties Representative Gatschenberger lives in Lake St. Louis where he works as a financial planner. Prior to politics he served as Director of Academic Advising for the University of Missouri-St. Louis. Gatschenberger is currently pursuing a master's degree from that institution. . He is a member of the Wentzville and Lake St. Louis Chambers of Commerce, Wentzville Rotary, and National Rifle Association. He attends Calvary West Church in Wentzville. Although he is not a Catholic, he is a member of the Knights of Columbus.

Politics
Gatschenberger first ran for the District 13 seat in 2006 but lost in the Republican primary, placing a distant second to Dr. Bob Onder. With Onder running for U.S. Congress in 2008, Gatshenberger was more successful on his second attempt, handily defeating fellow Republican Kevin Kuhlmann in the August primary and Democrat David Hurst in the general election. Gatschenberger defeated his Democratic challenger, former Wentzville mayor Vickie Boedecker, in November 2010 to win his second term in Jefferson City.

Legislative assignments
 Chairman, Interim Committee on 911 Access
 Chairman, Local Government
 Ways and Means
 Appropriations - General Administration
 Downsizing State Government

Electoral history

State Representative

 rl

State Senate

References

Republican Party members of the Missouri House of Representatives
Politicians from Springfield, Illinois
People from Lake St. Louis, Missouri
Businesspeople from Missouri
1956 births
Living people
University of Missouri–St. Louis alumni